Llanspyddid is a small village just west of Brecon within the Brecon Beacons National Park.   It lies within the valley of the River Usk in the community of Glyn Tarell in the county of Powys, Wales. Llanspyddid sits on the A40 trunk road between Brecon and Llandovery. The Welsh name signifies the 'church of Saint Ysbyddyd', though the village church is in fact dedicated to Saint Cadog.

References

External links
 images of Llanspyddid and surrounding area on Geograph website

Fforest Fawr
Villages in Powys
Glyn Tarell